Shoaib Ahmed Shaikh also known as SAS (born 17 April 1971) is a Pakistani businessman and convicted felon. He is the founder of 24-hour news cycle network named BOL Network. He also founded diploma mill company Axact.

Early life 
Shoaib was born on 17 April 1971 in Karachi, Sindh to middle-class family. His father was a Sindh High Court lawyer who also served some years as the principal of the Islamia College. Shaikh has four siblings.

Career

Founding BOL Network (2013) 
In June 2013,  Shoaib Ahmed Sheikh started a Pakistani 24-hour news cycle network named BOL Network. According to him, BOL Network was meant to create an independent media house to portray a soft image of Pakistan. The company also announced a television set brand by the name of BG.

Arrest 
Following the publication of the New York Times article, Pakistan's Interior Minister directed the country's Federal Investigation Agency to begin inquiry into whether the company was involved in any legal business. Following the interior minister's order, cyber crime team of FIA raided Axact’s office in Karachi and Islamabad and seized computers, recorded statements of employees as well taking into custody 25 employees of the company and 28 employees from Rawalpindi office. The FIA team found and seized several blank degrees as well as fake letterhead of the US State Department. The investigation was transferred from the FIA's cyber crime department to its corporate department. Regarding the New York Times article it is known that Shoaib Shaikh had made over $89 million Dollars and had laundered money through shell companies in the US and more offshore companies which were used to fund Axact and their news company BOL. The issue was also taken up in Senate of Pakistan where Chairman of the Senate Raza Rabbani constituted a committee to probe into the issue. Pakistan's tax authorities and the SECP also initiated investigations into the company.

On 26 May 2015, Federal Investigation Agency arrested Shoaib Ahmed Shaikh for investigation. The case was filed against him on 27 May 2015, in Karachi, Pakistan. Subsequently, Axact was sealed on 28 May 2015, and the Information ministry requested the Pakistan Electronic Media Regulatory Authority (PEMRA) to close down BOL.  He was given bail prior to his conviction, the case filed against him on the charges of alleged fraud, extortion, and money laundering.

On 26 May 2015, Federal Investigation Agency arrested Shoaib Ahmed Shaikh for investigation. The case was filed against him on 27 May 2015, in Karachi, Pakistan.

On 26 September 2018, Shaikh was sentenced to 7 years in prison for the diploma mill conspiracies, along with several other accomplices. His wife was acquitted of all charges.

In July 2018, the court announced a 20-year jail sentence to him along with 22 others regarding the fake degree case, and was subsequently sentenced in September 2018.

References 

Living people
Axact
BOL Network people
Businesspeople from Karachi
Pakistani mass media businesspeople
Pakistani chief executives
Pakistani fraudsters
Pakistani prisoners and detainees
Pakistani money launderers
People with acquired Saint Kitts and Nevis citizenship
People convicted of fraud
Saint Kitts and Nevis people of Pakistani descent
1971 births